Viral vectors are  tools commonly used by molecular biologists to deliver genetic material into cells. This process can be performed inside a living organism (in vivo) or in cell culture (in vitro). Viruses have evolved specialized molecular mechanisms to efficiently transport their genomes inside the cells they infect. Delivery of genes or other genetic material by a vector is termed transduction and the infected cells are described as transduced. Molecular biologists first harnessed this machinery in the 1970s. Paul Berg used a modified SV40 virus containing DNA from the bacteriophage λ to infect monkey kidney cells maintained in culture.

In addition to their use in molecular biology research, viral vectors are used for gene therapy and the development of vaccines. Vectors can either integrate into a cell's genome or transiently express a gene with non-integrative vectors.

Key properties of a viral vector
Viral Vectors are tailored to their specific applications but generally share a few key properties.
Safety: Although viral vectors are occasionally created from pathogenic viruses, they are modified in such a way as to minimize the risk of handling them. This usually involves the deletion of a part of the viral genome critical for viral replication. Such a virus can efficiently infect cells but, once the infection has taken place, requires a helper virus to provide the missing proteins for production of new virions.
Low toxicity: The viral vector should have a minimal effect on the physiology of the cell it infects.
Stability: Some viruses are genetically unstable and can rapidly rearrange their genomes. This is detrimental to predictability and reproducibility of the work conducted using a viral vector and is avoided in their design.
Cell type specificity: Most viral vectors are engineered to infect as wide a range of cell types as possible. However, sometimes the opposite is preferred. The viral receptor can be modified to target the virus to a specific kind of cell. Viruses modified in this manner are said to be pseudotyped.
Identification: Viral vectors are often given certain genes that help identify which cells took up the viral genes. These genes are called markers. A common marker is resistance to a certain antibiotic. The cells can then be isolated easily, as those that have not taken up the viral vector genes do not have antibiotic resistance, and so cannot grow in a culture with the relevant antibiotic present.

Applications

Basic research
Viral vectors were originally developed as an alternative to transfection of naked DNA for molecular genetics experiments. Compared to traditional methods of transfection (like calcium phosphate precipitation), transduction can ensure that nearly 100% of cells are infected without severely affecting cell viability. Furthermore, some viruses integrate into the cell genome facilitating stable expression.

Protein coding genes can be expressed using viral vectors, commonly to study the function of the particular protein. Viral vectors, especially retroviruses, stably expressing marker genes such as GFP are widely used to permanently label cells to track them and their progeny, for example in xenotransplantation experiments, when cells infected in vitro are implanted into a host animal.

Gene insertion, which can be done with viral vectors, is cheaper to carry out than gene knockout. But as gene silencing, an effect that may be intended with gene insertion, is sometimes non-specific and has off-target effects on other genes, it hence provides less reliable results. Animal host vectors also play .

Gene therapy

Gene therapy is a technique for correcting defective genes responsible for disease development. In the future, gene therapy may provide a way to cure genetic disorders, such as severe combined immunodeficiency, cystic fibrosis or even haemophilia A. Because these diseases result from mutations in the DNA sequence for specific genes,  gene therapy trials have used viruses to deliver unmutated copies of these genes to the cells of the patient's body. There have been a huge number of laboratory successes with gene therapy. However, several problems of viral gene therapy must be overcome before it gains widespread use. Immune response to viruses not only impedes the delivery of genes to target cells but can cause severe complications for the patient. In one of the early gene therapy trials in 1999 this led to the death of Jesse Gelsinger, who was treated using an adenoviral vector.

Some viral vectors, for instance  gamma-retroviruses, insert their genomes at a seemingly random location on one of the host chromosomes, which can disturb the function of cellular genes and lead to cancer. In a severe combined immunodeficiency retroviral gene therapy trial conducted in 2002, four of the patients developed leukemia as a consequence of the treatment; three of the patients recovered after chemotherapy.  Adeno-associated virus-based vectors are much safer in this respect as they always integrate at the same site in the human genome, with applications in various disorders, such as Alzheimer's disease.

Vaccines

A live vector vaccine is a vaccine that uses an organism (typically virus or bacterium) that does not cause disease to transport the pathogen genes into the body in order to stimulate an immune response. Viruses expressing pathogen proteins are currently being developed as vaccines against these pathogens, based on the same rationale as DNA vaccines. The genes used in such vaccines are usually antigen coding surface proteins from the pathogenic organism. They are then inserted into the genome of a non-pathogenic organism, 

Unlike attenuated vaccines, viral vector vaccines lack other pathogen genes required for replication, so infection by the pathogen is impossible. Adenoviruses are being actively developed as vaccine vectors.

Medicine delivery
A strain of canarypox virus modified to carry feline interleukin-2 is used to treat cats with fibrosarcoma.

Types

Retroviruses

Retroviruses are one of the mainstays of current gene therapy approaches. The recombinant retroviruses such as the Moloney murine leukemia virus have the ability to integrate into the host genome in a stable fashion. They contain a reverse transcriptase to make a DNA copy of the RNA genome, and an integrase that allows integration into the host genome. They have been used in a number of FDA-approved clinical trials such as the SCID-X1 trial.

Retroviral vectors can either be replication-competent or replication-defective. Replication-defective vectors are the most common choice in studies because the viruses have had the coding regions for the genes necessary for additional rounds of virion replication and packaging replaced with other genes, or deleted. These virus are capable of infecting their target cells and delivering their viral payload, but then fail to continue the typical lytic pathway that leads to cell lysis and death.

Conversely, replication-competent viral vectors contain all necessary genes for virion synthesis, and continue to propagate themselves once infection occurs. Because the viral genome for these vectors is much lengthier, the length of the actual inserted gene of interest is limited compared to the possible length of the insert for replication-defective vectors. Depending on the viral vector, the typical maximum length of an allowable DNA insert in a replication-defective viral vector is usually about 8–10 kB. While this limits the introduction of many genomic sequences, most cDNA sequences can still be accommodated.

The primary drawback to use of retroviruses such as the Moloney retrovirus involves the requirement for cells to be actively dividing for transduction. As a result, cells such as neurons are very resistant to infection and transduction by retroviruses.

There is concern that insertional mutagenesis due to integration into the host genome might lead to cancer or leukemia. This concern remained theoretical until gene therapy for ten SCID-X1 patients using Moloney murine leukemia virus resulted in two cases of leukemia caused by activation of the LMO2 oncogene due to nearby integration of the vector.

Lentiviruses

Lentiviruses are a subclass of retroviruses. They are sometimes used as vectors for gene therapy thanks to their ability to integrate into the genome of non-dividing cells, which is a unique feature of lentiviruses, as other retroviruses can infect only dividing cells. The viral genome in the form of RNA is reverse-transcribed when the virus enters the cell to produce DNA, which is then inserted into the genome at a random position (although recent findings suggest that the insertion of viral DNA is not random but directed to specific active genes and related to genome organisation) by the viral integrase enzyme. The vector, now called a provirus, remains in the genome and is passed on to the progeny of the cell when it divides. There are, as yet, no techniques for determining the site of integration, which can pose a problem. The provirus can disturb the function of cellular genes and lead to activation of oncogenes promoting the development of cancer, which raises concerns for possible applications of lentiviruses in gene therapy. However, studies have shown that lentivirus vectors have a lower tendency to integrate in places that potentially cause cancer than gamma-retroviral vectors. More specifically, one study found that lentiviral vectors did not cause either an increase in tumor incidence or an earlier onset of tumors in a mouse strain prone to tumors. Moreover, clinical trials that utilized lentiviral vectors to deliver gene therapy for the treatment of HIV experienced no increase in mutagenic or oncologic events. Versions of the lentiviral vector have been developed that do not integrate their genetic material into the cell's genome but only transiently express genes.

For safety reasons, lentiviral vectors never carry the genes required for their replication. To produce a lentivirus, several plasmids are transfected into a so-called packaging cell line, commonly HEK 293. One or more plasmids, generally referred to as packaging plasmids, encode the virion proteins, such as the capsid and the reverse transcriptase. Another plasmid contains the genetic material to be delivered by the vector. It is transcribed to produce the single-stranded RNA viral genome and is marked by the presence of the ψ (psi) sequence. This sequence is used to package the genome into the virion.

Adenoviruses

As opposed to lentiviruses, adenoviral DNA does not integrate into the genome and is not replicated during cell division. This limits their use in basic research, although adenoviral vectors are still used in in vitro and also in vivo experiments. Their primary applications are in gene therapy and vaccination. Since humans commonly come in contact with adenoviruses, which cause respiratory, gastrointestinal and eye infections, majority of patients have already developed neutralizing antibodies which can inactivate the virus before it can reach the target cell. To overcome this problem scientists are currently investigating adenoviruses that infect different species to which humans do not have immunity, for example, the chimpanzee adenovirus used as a vector to transport SARS-CoV-2 spike gene in Oxford AstraZeneca COVID vaccine. PEGylation of adenoviruses for gene therapy can help prevent adverse reactions due to pre-existing adenovirus immunity.

Adeno-associated viruses

Adeno-associated virus (AAV) is a small virus that infects humans and some other primate species. AAV is not currently known to cause disease, and causes a very mild immune response. AAV can infect both dividing and non-dividing cells and may incorporate its genome into that of the host cell. Moreover, AAV mostly stays as episomal (replicating without incorporation into the chromosome); performing long and stable expression. These features make AAV a very attractive candidate for creating viral vectors for gene therapy. However, AAV can only bring up to 5kb which is considerably small compared to AAV's original capacity.

Adeno-associated viral vectors have been engineered to evade virus recognition by TLR9 receptors by incorporating TLR9-inhibiting genes into the vector.

Furthermore, because of its potential use as a gene therapy vector, researchers have created an altered AAV called self-complementary adeno-associated virus (scAAV). Whereas AAV packages a single strand of DNA and requires the process of second-strand synthesis, scAAV packages both strands which anneal together to form double stranded DNA. By skipping second strand synthesis scAAV allows for rapid expression in the cell. Otherwise, scAAV carries many characteristics of its AAV counterpart.

Plant viruses 

Plant viruses can be used to engineer viral vectors, tools commonly used to deliver genetic material into plant cells; they are also sources of biomaterials and nanotechnology devices. Tobacco mosaic virus (TMV) is the first virus to be discovered. Viral vectors based on tobacco mosaic virus include those of the magnICON and TRBO plant expression technologies.

Hybrids
Hybrid vectors are vector viruses that are genetically engineered to have qualities of more than one vector. Viruses are altered to avoid the shortcomings of typical viral vectors, which may have limited loading capacity, immunogenicity, genotoxicity, and fail to support long-term adequate transgenic expression. Through the replacement of undesirable elements with desired abilities, hybrid vectors may in the future outperform standard transfection vectors in terms of safety and therapeutic efficiency.

Challenges in application
The choice of a viral vector to deliver genetic material to cells comes with some logistical problems. There are a limited number of viral vectors available for therapeutic use.  Any of these few viral vectors can cause the body to develop an immune response if the vector is seen as a foreign invader. Once used, the viral vector cannot be effectively used in the patient again because it will be recognized by the body. If the vaccine or gene therapy fails in clinical trials, the virus can't be used again in the patient for a different vaccine or gene therapy in the future.

Pre-existing immunity against the viral vector could also be present in the patient, rendering the therapy ineffective for that patient. Because priming with a naked DNA vaccine and boosting with a viral vector results in a robust immune response via yet indefinite mechanism(s), despite pre-existing viral vector immunity, this vaccination strategy can counteract this problem.
However, this method may present another expense and obstacle in the vaccine distribution process. Pre-existing immunity may also be challenged by increasing vaccine dose or changing the vaccination route.

Some shortcomings of viral vectors (such as genotoxicity and low transgenic expression) can be overcome through the use of hybrid vectors.

See also 
Viral transformation

References

Further reading 

 

Cell culture techniques
Gene delivery
Molecular genetics
Virotherapy